MT Gustaf E. Reuter was a 6,336 ton Swedish motor tanker belonging to the company Rederi AB Reut. She was built in 1928 by the Eriksbergs Mekaniska Verkstad shipyard in Gothenburg.

On a voyage from Haugesund to Curaçao she was torpedoed and sunk by the U-boat  at 00.30 on 27 November 1939 at the position , 14 miles west-northwest from Fair Isle, in Shetland, Scotland, and broke in two. The wreck was sunk by an escort vessel the next day. One person died while 33 survived.

References 

1928 ships
Ships built in Gothenburg
World War II tankers
World War II shipwrecks in the North Sea
Ships sunk by German submarines in World War II
Maritime incidents in November 1939
World War II merchant ships of Sweden
1928 in Sweden
Shipwrecks of Scotland
History of Shetland
Fair Isle
1939 in Scotland